The 2013 local elections were held in Split, Croatia on 19 May and 2 June 2013.

The incumbent HGS mayor Željko Kerum  was running for a full four-year term after winning the previous elections on 31 May 2009. Kerum had a very controversial term as mayor between 2009 and 2013, which resulted in losing in the first round of elections with 18.51% of the votes. The second round of elections was very tense. The SDP candidate for mayor, Ivo Baldasar, defeated HDZ candidate, Vjekoslav Ivanišević, by 615 votes. After the elections Ivanišević asked for a recount. The recount was done and Baldasar was proclaimed the winner.

The SDP-HNS-HSU coalition won also in the council elections and formed a minor government.

Results

Mayor

City Council

Split local
Split local
Split 2013
Split local
Split local
History of Split, Croatia